BC Kraft Mööbel/Kohila is a basketball club based in Kohila, Estonia that played in the Korvpalli Meistriliiga, the premier professional basketball league in Estonia, during the 2007-2008 season.

Players

Roster for the 2007-2008 season
     Heigo Erm          (EST)
     Greg Mcquay        (USA)
 #4  Rauno Tamm         (EST)
 #6  Martin Uusmaa      (EST)
 #7  Anton Batanov      (EST)
 #8  Karl-Peeter Dorbek (EST)
 #9  Reimo Tamm         (EST)
 #10 Martin Lang        (EST)
 #11 Sander Saat        (EST)
 #12 Raido Pomerants    (EST)
 #14 Peeter Kraavik     (EST)
 #15 Heiko Niidas       (EST)

Coaches
 Ozell Wells (USA) (head coach)
 Jüri Pritsin (EST)

Kraft Moobel Kohila